Chaetosiphon may refer to:
 Chaetosiphon (alga), an alga genus of the family Chaetosiphonaceae
 Chaetosiphon (aphid), an insect genus of the family Aphididae